The Ministry of Justice was a government ministry of the State of Pasundan. The ministry was responsible for the justice system, penitentiary system, publishing of government gazette, dactyloscopy, and beachcombing in the State of Pasundan.

Transfer of power 
After the establishment of the Adil Cabinet on 8 May 1948, prime minister Adil Puradiredja appointed Suparman as the Minister of Home Affairs. The formation of the ministry was done one month later, on 11 June 1948, after the handover of the authority from the Recomba (government commissioner for administrative affairs) to the Minister of Justice. The instrument of transfer for this purpose was the Staatsblaad (State Gazette) 1948 No. 116.

The authority of the court system in Pasundan is reserved for the Supreme Court of the United States of Indonesia, while the authority of the prison system was run by the Ministry of Justice and the federal government. The minimum security prison in Bandung, Sumedang, Garut, Tasikmalaya, Ciamis, Bogor, Sukabumi, Cirebon (except for the federal prison), and Majalengka were held by the Ministry of Justice, while the maximum security prison, the federal prison in Ciamis, the Sukamiskin and Kuningan Prison, were held by the federal government. The authority for the registration of prison sentences of more than one year and prison statistics, were also done by the federal government.

Due to the larger authorities held by the federal government, the Pasundan government was powerless to hinder the wide-scale political arrests of members of its Indonesian population by the Dutch; it could no nothing to succor them once they were arrested.

Duties 
According to the Staatsblaad (State Gazette) 1948 No. 232, dated 23 September 1948, the duties of the Recomba that were handed over to the Ministry of Justice covered the following:
 orphanages, real estates, notary, and civil status
 penitentiary system
 statistics, justice administration, and the handling of prisoners
 recognition of associations and compliance with the articles of association of public limited liability companies
 name adoption and change
 civil, commercial and criminal law, and all government interference related to it and to the judiciary in general
 beachcombing
 witnessing of legalization
 dactyloscopy
 nurturing of minors placed under the supervision of the state
 rehabilitation of prisoners
 legal advice for governmental bodies
 land acquisition for the interests of the state

By the Decree of the Wali Negara No. 117 and 118 dated 25 November 1948, the Ministry of Justice was handed with the publishing of government gazettes. The first gazette, the Berita Negara Pasundan (Pasundan State News), covers the announcement of laws, state regulations, etc. The second gazette, the Warta Resmi Pasundan (Pasundan Official Gazette), covers the announcement of decrees, official appointments by the state, and official announcements.

Building 
After the formation of the ministry, the ministry was given two rooms (later eight rooms) at the Gedung Sate (Satay Building) in Bandung. On 1 May 1949, due to lack of space in the Satay Building, the ministry moved into the third floor at the DENIS Bank Building, located at the Braga Street No. 14.

Ministers

Bibliography

References

Notes

Government ministries of Pasundan
Ministries established in 1948
Ministries disestablished in 1950